Nauru competed in the 2014 Commonwealth Games in Glasgow, Scotland from 23 July – 3 August 2014. Nauru's team consisted of ten athletes in four sports. Participating for the seventh time, Nauru, the smallest sovereign state in the Commonwealth of Nations, holds a "remarkable" record at the Commonwealth Games, having won twenty-eight medals during their first six participations, of which ten gold. Weightlifter Yukio Peter, Nauru's only gold medallist at the 2010 Games, did not defending his title in Glasgow, but Delhi weightlifting silver medallist Itte Detenamo was present.

Due to a scheduling conflict between the Commonwealth Games and the 2014 Micronesian Games in Pohnpei, Nauru had to split its delegation between the two events.

Medalists

Athletics

Two athletes represented the country.

Boxing

Three boxers represented the country.

Men

Judo

One judoka represented Nauru.

Men

Weightlifting

Four weightlifters represented the country.

Men

References

Nations at the 2014 Commonwealth Games
Nauru at the Commonwealth Games
2014 in Nauruan sport